Melville is a suburb of Perth, Western Australia located within the likewise named City of Melville.

History
Melville is named after the nearby Melville Water, a section of the Swan River. Melville Water was named after Robert Dundas, 2nd Viscount Melville, by Governor James Stirling. The name was first used in the area for the Melville Park Estate in 1896.

References

External links

Suburbs of Perth, Western Australia
Suburbs in the City of Melville